The House of Rechberg is the name of an old noble comital family in Swabia during the Holy Roman Empire period. They were sovereign counts of Rechberg and Rothenlöwen. As a mediatized house (mediatized by Württemberg in 1806), the family belonged to high nobility.

Notable family members

Ulrich I von Rechberg, ca. 1140–1206, auf Hohenrechberg, Swabian Marescalc, married  Edilhardis von Ramis and Berchterad von Biberbach
Hildebrand (Hiltprand) von Rechberg, fl 1194–1226, auf Hohenrechberg, d. before 1235, married Anna, daughter of Heinrich Marschall von Pappenheim
Conrad I "Monacus" von Rechberg, fl 1235,
Conrad II "der Landvogt" von Rechberg, fl 1259
Albrecht (I) "der Landvogt" von Rechberg, fl 1293,
Albrecht III von Rechberg, zu Staufeneck, zu Falkenstein d. 1408
Wilhelm I von Rechberg zu Hohenrechberg, d. after 1401; married Sophie von Veringen, daughter of Heinrich IV of Veringen
Heinrich I von Rechberg zu Hohenrechberg und Gammertingen,d. 1437; married Agnes von Helfenstein, daughter of Ulrich VII of Helfenstein
Hans von Rechberg-Hohenrechberg, zu Gammertingen, married Veronika von Waldburg (d. 1443) and Elisabeth von Werdenberg-Sargans, daughter of Heinrich IX (II) of Werdenberg-Sonnenberg (d. 1469)

See also
Rechberg and Rothenlöwen

German noble families

de:Grafen von Rechberg